Sarah Janina Ryglewski (born 31 January 1983) is a German politician of the Social Democratic Party (SPD) who has been serving as a member of the Bundestag from the state of Bremen since 2015. 

In addition to her parliamentary work, Ryglewski has served as Parliamentary State Secretary at the Federal Ministry of Finance in the government of Chancellor Angela Merkel (2019–2021) and as Minister of State for Federal-State Relations in the government of Chancellor Olaf Scholz.

Early life and education 
Born in Köln, North Rhine-Westphalia, Ryglewski studied political science at the University of Bremen from 2002 until 2009.

Political career

Career in state politics 
Since 2010, Ryglewski has been the deputy chair of the SPD in Bremen. 

From 2011 to 2015, Ryglewski served as a member of the State Parliament of Bremen. She was her parliamentary group’s spokesperson on consumer protection issues.

Member of the German Parliament, 2015–present 
After Carsten Sieling was elected mayor of Bremen in July 2015, Ryglewski took his seat as a member of the Bundestag, representing the Bremen I district. In parliament, she served on the Finance Committee (2015-2019), the Committee on Petitions (2015-2017), the Committee on Legal Affairs and Consumer Protection (2018-2019) and the Budget Committee's Subcommittee on European Affairs (2018-2019). Within the SPD parliamentary group, she belongs to the Parliamentary Left, a left-wing movement.

In the negotiations to form a fourth coalition government under Merkel's leadership following the 2017 federal elections, Ryglewski was part of the working group on internal and legal affairs, led by Thomas de Maizière, Stephan Mayer and Heiko Maas. From 2018 until 2019, she was her parliamentary group's spokesperson for consumer protections issues. 

In 2019, Ryglewski succeeded Christine Lambrecht as Parliamentary State Secretary at the Federal Ministry of Finance, under the leadership of minister Olaf Scholz.

In the negotiations to form a so-called traffic light coalition of the SPD, the Green Party and the Free Democratic Party (FDP) following the 2021 federal elections, Ryglewski was part of her party's delegation in the working group on financial regulation and the national budget, co-chaired by Doris Ahnen, Lisa Paus and Christian Dürr.

Other activities 
 Business Forum of the Social Democratic Party of Germany, Member of the Political Advisory Board (since 2020)
 Federal Foundation for the Reappraisal of the SED Dictatorship, Member of the Board of Trustees (since 2019)
 spw – Zeitschrift für sozialistische Politik und Wirtschaft, Member of the Editorial Board
 German United Services Trade Union (ver.di), Member

References

External links 

  
 Bundestag biography 

1983 births
Living people
Members of the Bundestag for Bremen
Female members of the Bundestag
21st-century German women politicians
Members of the Bundestag 2021–2025
Members of the Bundestag 2017–2021
Members of the Bundestag 2013–2017
Politicians from Cologne
Members of the Bundestag for the Social Democratic Party of Germany
Parliamentary State Secretaries of Germany